Kolobovo is a rural locality (a village) in Belokrestskoye Rural Settlement, Chagodoshchensky District, Vologda Oblast, Russia. The population was 19 as of 2002.

Geography 
Baranovo is the nearest rural locality.

References 

Rural localities in Chagodoshchensky District